BT-3 may refer to:
 BT-3, a type of BT tank Soviet light tank
Brabham BT3, a Formula One racing car
 BT3, a BT postcode area for Belfast

See also
Dragon Ball Z: Budokai Tenkaichi#Dragon Ball Z: Budokai Tenkaichi 3 (2007)